Samuel Darchy (born May 30, 1980 in Marvejols) is a French professional football player. Currently, he plays in the Championnat National for Rodez AF.

1980 births
Living people
French footballers
Ligue 2 players
US Albi players
Clermont Foot players
Pau FC players
Rodez AF players
Association football forwards
Wasquehal Football players